, sometimes also called  is the name of a section of a longer street in Kamakura, Kanagawa, Japan. Although certainly old enough, historical documents written at the time of the Kamakura shogunate like the Azuma Kagami do not mention it.

Notes

References
 

Kamakura, Kanagawa